The Indian Head Site is a  archaeological site located along the Maurice River in Deerfield Township, Cumberland County, New Jersey, United States. Relics have been recovered here spanning nearly 10,000 years, from the Paleo-Indians to the indigenous peoples of the Eastern Woodlands. The site was added to the National Register of Historic Places on October 27, 2004.

See also
 National Register of Historic Places listings in Cumberland County, New Jersey

References

Deerfield Township, New Jersey	
Native American history of New Jersey
National Register of Historic Places in Cumberland County, New Jersey
Archaeological sites on the National Register of Historic Places in New Jersey
New Jersey Register of Historic Places